Saint-Acheul is a commune in the Somme department in Hauts-de-France in northern France. It is not to be confused with Saint-Acheul, a suburb of Amiens after which the Acheulean archaeological culture of the Lower Paleolithic is named.

Geography

Population

History
In the first century AD the Romans settled the area and a monastery was built in St Acheul during the Middle Ages.
The name honors Saint Acheolus, who was martyred in Amiens around 290 AD.
Saint Ulphia was a hermit here during the 8th century.

See also
Communes of the Somme department

References

Communes of Somme (department)
Prehistoric sites in France
Archaeological type sites
Lower Paleolithic